Separator can refer to:
 A mechanical device to separate fluids and solids, like
 Cream separator, separates cream from milk
 Demister (vapor), removal of liquid droplets entrained in a vapor stream
 Separator (oil production), of an oil production plant
 Vapor-liquid separator, separates a vapor-liquid mixture
 a machine used to produce mechanically separated meat
 The historic Swedish company name AB Separator, common ancestor of Alfa Laval and DeLaval
 Air classifier, a mechanical device to separate components of air
 Community separator, a term of urban planning
 Separator (electricity), a porous or ion-conducting barrier used to separate anode and cathode in electrochemical systems, also known as diaphragm
 Planar separator theorem, a theorem in graph theory
 Vertex separator, a notion in graph theory
 Geometric separator, a line that separates a set of geometric shapes to two subsets
 A synonym for "generator" in category theory
 A mathematical sign used to separate the integer part from the fractional part of a number. For example, the decimal point and the binary point
 A synonym for "delimiter" in computer parlance
 Orthodontic spacer, also known as orthodontic separators
 Four of the C0 and C1 control codes used in digital character encoding
 A song by Radiohead, off the 2011 album The King of Limbs
 In computing, a Printer separator to flag the start and end of jobs on a printer

See also
 Separatrix (disambiguation)
 Separation (disambiguation)
 Separation theorem (disambiguation)
 Decimal separator
 Thousands separator